România Nouă was a newspaper from Chişinău, the Moldavian Republic, founded by Onisifor Ghibu in January 1918. It was the successor of Ardealul. România Nouă was published between 24 January – 2 December 1918 and 1 June 1926 – 1 June 1927.

References

Bibliography 
 Almanahul dicţionar al presei din România şi a celei româneşti de pretutindeni de G. Caliga. – București, 1926. – P. 155.

External links 
 PRESA BASARABEANĂ de la începuturi pînă în anul 1957. Catalog

1918 establishments in Romania
1927 disestablishments in Romania
Defunct newspapers published in Moldova
Mass media in Chișinău
Publications established in 1918
Publications disestablished in 1927
Romanian-language newspapers published in Moldova